The Himalayas lies in the  north of West Bengal and the Bay of Bengal is at the south. Between them, the river Ganga flows eastwards and its main distributary, the Hooghly River, flows south to reach the Bay of Bengal. The Siliguri Corridor, which connects North-East India with rest of the India, lies in the North Bengal region of the state. Geographically, West Bengal is divided into a variety of regions—Darjeeling Himalayan hill region, Terai and Dooars region, North Bengal plains, Rarh region, Western plateau and high lands, coastal plains, Sundarbans and the Ganga Delta.

In 1947, when India gained independence, the state of West Bengal was formed, with 14 districts, as per partition plan of the then Bengal province of British India. The former princely state Koch Bihar joined as a district on 26 January 1950, and the former French enclave Chandannagore joined as part of the Hooghly district in 1954. The States Reorganisation Act of 1956 led to addition of Purulia district to the state and to enlargement of West Dinajpur district. Later, larger districts such as West Dinajpur, 24 Parganas and Midnapore were bifurcated.

West Bengal is now divided into 23 districts which includes the newly formed Alipurduar district (formed on 25 June 2014), Kalimpong district (formed on 14 February 2017), Jhargram district (formed on 4 April 2017), and the splitting of the former Bardhaman district into Purba Bardhaman district and  Paschim Bardhaman district (formed on 7 April 2017). The districts are grouped into five divisions.

Divisions are administered by Divisional Commissioners. Kolkata, the capital of the state, constitutes the Kolkata district. Other districts are further divided into administrative units such as subdivisions and blocks, administered by SDO and BDO, respectively. The Panchayati Raj has a three-tier structure in the state. The atomic unit is called a Gram Panchayat, which is the Panchayat organisation for a collection of villages. The block-level organisations are called Panchayat Samiti, and the district-level organisations are named Zilla Parishad.

The West Bengal cabinet has approved the creation of seven new districts on 1 August 2022. This will number district from 23 to 30. New Sundarban District from existing South 24 Parganas District, new Ichhamati District and Basirhat District from existing North 24 Parganas District. New Ranaghat District from existing Nadia District and Bishnupur District from existing Bankura district. While new Jangipur District and Berhampore district from existing Murshidabad District will be carved out.

Geography

West Bengal is bordered by three countries: Nepal, Bhutan and Bangladesh; and five Indian states: Sikkim, Bihar, Jharkhand, Odisha, and Assam. Sikkim and Bhutan are located to the north of the state, Nepal to the northwest, Bihar and Jharkhand in the west, Odisha in the southwest, the Bay of Bengal to the south, and Bangladesh and Assam are in the east. West Bengal is the only state of India that has both snowy mountains (Himalayas in the north) and sea beaches (on the coast of the Bay of Bengal in the south). In between them, the river Ganga enters the state from west, before it branches off into its main distributaries: the Hooghly River, which flows southwards to reach the Bay of Bengal, and the Padma River, which flows eastwards into Bangladesh.

The districts that are located at the north of the Ganga—Darjeeling, Jalpaiguri, Cooch Behar, Malda, Uttar Dinajpur, Dakshin Dinajpur, Alipurduar and Kalimpong — are often referred to collectively as North Bengal. Kalimpong is a newly added district of West Bengal. Geographically, this area is divided into the Darjeeling Himalayan hill region, the Terai and Dooars region, and the North Bengal plains. The Siliguri Corridor, also known as Chicken's Neck, which connects North-East India with rest of the India, lies in this region. The Indo-Bangladesh enclaves are either enclaves or exclaves of the Cooch Behar district or the Jalpaiguri district.

The districts on the south of the Ganges—Bankura, Paschim Bardhaman, Purba Bardhaman, Birbhum, Purulia, Murshidabad, Nadia, West Midnapore, Jhargram, East Midnapore, Hooghly, Howrah, Kolkata, North 24 Parganas and South 24 Parganas—constitute a variety of geographical regions such as the Rarh region, the Western plateau and high lands, the coastal plains, the Sunderbans and the Ganga Delta. Kolkata, the capital of the state, constitutes the Kolkata district.

The uninhabited South Talpatti Island, which surfaced in the Bay of Bengal in the 1970s near the Indo-Bangladesh border, is claimed by both India and Bangladesh.

History
After India gained independence in 1947, the province of Bengal was partitioned along religious lines. The western part remained in India (and was named West Bengal) while the eastern part joined newly formed Pakistan as a province called East Pakistan (later giving rise to Bangladesh in 1971). At the time of its creation in 1947, the state of West Bengal was divided into 14 districts—Bankura, Birbhum, Burdwan, Calcutta (Kolkata), Darjeeling, Jalpaiguri, Hooghly, Howrah, Malda, Midnapore, Murshidabad, Nadia, West Dinajpur and 24 Parganas. Cooch Behar district was a princely state named Koch Bihar till 20 August 1949, when the state formally agreed to join India. Transfer of administration was started on 12 September 1949 and was completed on 19 January 1950, when Cooch Behar became a district of West Bengal. Chandannagar, which was earlier part of the French India, had voted to join India in a plebiscite in 1949. Formally, it joined India in 1952 and finally became a part of the Hooghly district of West Bengal on 2 October 1954. The States Reorganisation Act of 1956 reorganised boundaries of the Indian states along linguistic lines. As this act was implemented, the then West Dinajpur district was enlarged with the addition of some areas from Bihar, and the Purulia district was formed on 1 November 1956 from parts of the Manbhum district of Bihar.

Later, some large districts were divided into smaller districts. On 1 March 1986, the district of 24 Parganas was bifurcated into two districts—the North 24 Parganas district and the South 24 Parganas district. On 1 April 1992, the West Dinajpur district was bifurcated into the Uttar Dinajpur district and the Dakshin Dinajpur district. On 1 January 2002, the erstwhile Midnapore district was bifurcated into the Purba Medinipur district and the Paschim Medinipur district.

Since 2007, the demand for a separate Gorkhaland state has been revived by the Gorkha Janmukti Morcha and its supporters in the Darjeeling hills. The Kamtapur People's Party and its supporters' movement for a separate Kamtapur state that covers the North Bengal has also gained momentum in the 2000s.

Administrative structure

A district is governed by a District Collector, who is better known as a District Magistrate (DM) in the state of West Bengal. A DM is an officer from either Indian Administrative Service (IAS) or West Bengal Civil Service (WBCS), and is appointed by the State Government of West Bengal. Each district is divided into subdivisions, except the Kolkata district, which contains urban area only, administered by Kolkata Municipal Corporation. A subdivision is governed by a sub-divisional magistrate (SDM), better known as a Sub-Divisional Officer (SDO). Other than urban units such as town municipalities, a subdivision contains 'community development blocks' (also known as CD blocks or blocks or Tehsil or Taluka). A block consists of urban units such as census towns and rural units called gram panchayats. A block is administered by a Block Development Officer (BDO),who is similar as Tehsildar and who is appointed by the Government of West Bengal.

A gram panchayat, which consists of a group of villages, is administered by a village council headed by a Pradhan. As per the West Bengal Panchayat Act, 1973, each Block has a Panchayat Samiti, whose members include the Pradhans of the constituent gram panchayats, and the MLAs from the block. A Panchayat Samiti is headed by a Sabhapati. The third tier of the Panchayati Raj is Zilla Parishad, a district level organisation with the Sabhapatis of the constituent Panchayat Samitis and the MLAs from the district as its members. A Zilla Parishad is headed by a Sabhadhipati. For the Darjeeling district, the Zilla Parishad has ceased to exist, but a similar organisation for the Siliguri subdivision exists, which is designated as a Mahakuma Parishad.

The Gorkha Hill Council, formed in 1988, administers three (out of four) subdivisions of the Darjeeling district: Darjeeling Sadar, Kalimpong and Kurseong. Gorkha Hill Council manages the departments of Public Health, Education, Public Works, Transport, Tourism, Market, Small scale industries, Agriculture, Agricultural waterways, Forest (except reserved forests), Water, Livestock, Vocational Training and Sports and Youth services. District administration of Darjeeling, which is still responsible for election, panchayat, law and order, revenue etc., also acts as an interface between the Council and the State Government.

A District Superintendent of Police, better known as a Superintendent of Police, heads the District Police organisation of West Bengal Police. This is as per the Police Act of 1861, which is applicable to the whole of India. The Superintendents of Police are officers of the Indian Police Service. For every subdivision, there is a Subdivision Police, headed by a Police officer of the rank of Assistant Superintendent of Police or Deputy Superintendent of Police. Under subdivisions, there are Police Circles, each headed by an Inspector of Police. A Police Circle consists of Police Stations, each headed by an Inspector of Police, or in case of rural areas, by a Sub-Inspector of Police.

The Calcutta High Court has the jurisdiction of the state of West Bengal. Though most of the districts have more courts other than a District Court, not every subdivision of the state has a Court.

A group of districts forms a division, which is administered by a 'Divisional Commissioner'. West Bengal is now divided in twenty three districts, grouped under five divisions:

Alphabetical listing of West Bengal Districts

Demographics
The following is a list of the basic demographic data for the districts of West Bengal at the time of the 2011 census by their population rank in India

Economy 
The following is a list of basic economic data for the districts of West Bengal as of 2013–2014, the latest year for which data is available:

See also
 List of RTO districts in West Bengal

References

External links
 Official website of Government of West Bengal

Districts
West Bengal